Mitochondrially encoded tRNA serine 2 (AGU/C) also known as MT-TS2 is a transfer RNA which in humans is encoded by the mitochondrial MT-TS2 gene.

MT-TS2 is a small 59 nucleotide RNA (human mitochondrial map position 12207-12265) that transfers the amino acid serine to a growing polypeptide chain at the ribosome site of protein synthesis during translation.

References